Jerlun is a small town in Kuala Kangsar District, Perak, Malaysia.

References

Kuala Kangsar District
Towns in Perak